Archibius of Alexandria was a grammarian of ancient Egypt. He was the son (or possibly father) of the renowned grammarian Apollonius the Sophist, and wrote an interpretation of the epigrams of Callimachus.

Notes

Ancient Greek grammarians
Ancient Alexandrians